Modhera is a village in Mehsana district of Gujarat, India. The town is well known for the Sun Temple of Chaulukya era. The town is located on the bank of Pushpavati river.

History

The town was known as Dharmaranya during Puranic age. It is believed that Rama had performed yagna here to cleanse the sin of killing Brahmin Ravana. He had built Modherak which was later known as Modhera. 

The Sun Temple was built during the reign of Bhima I of Chaulukya dynasty in 1026-1027 (Vikram Samvat 1083). Gyaneshwari stepwell located in village belongs to 16-17th century. It has a shrine at the first pavilion of the stepwell instead of usual at the end. Modheshwari Mata Temple is located in the village.

Economy

Electricity
Modhera became the first "solar village" of India. A total of 1300 out of the 1600 houses in the village installed rooftop solar systems. The project cost  with half financed by the Government of Gujarat and the other half by the Government of India.

See also
Modh

References

Villages in Mehsana district